Knight Broadcasting Inc. is a radio broadcasting company founded by Shawn Knight and based in Santa Maria, California. Knight, a native of Santa Barbara, died June 15, 2022 in a paragliding accident in eastern Ventura County.

The company owns and operates three radio stations, all available via online streaming. The stations' signals cover most of Santa Barbara County.

Stations

References

Santa Barbara County, California